
AD 94 (XCIV) was a common year starting on Wednesday (link will display the full calendar) of the Julian calendar. At the time, it was known as the Year of the Consulship of Calpurnius and Magius (or, less frequently, year 847 Ab urbe condita). The denomination AD 94 for this year has been used since the early medieval period, when the Anno Domini calendar era became the prevalent method in Europe for naming years.

Events

By place

Roman Empire 
 Emperor Domitian rebuilds and rededicates the Curia Julia (meeting place of the Roman Senate), which had burned down in AD 64.
 Domitian banishes all Stoic philosophers from Rome.

Asia 
 The Chinese General Ban Chao completes his conquest of the Tarim Basin by taking Yānqi, which is located on the strategic Silk Road.

By topic

Literature 
 The Roman poet Publius Papinius Statius retires to Naples from Rome (approximate date).

Births 
 An of Han, Chinese emperor (d. 125)

References 

0094